Scott Curtis (born May 5, 1976) is an American actor and musician.

Life and career
Curtis was born in Van Nuys, California, United States. As a former child actor, he is known for his role as Brandon Capwell (1984-1985) on the daytime television series Santa Barbara. He also had a regular role on Aaron's Way, amongst other shows. In 1988 Curtis had the lead role in the horror film Cameron's Closet. Curtis was the voice actor for the "Buzzy" character at Walt Disney World's Cranium Command attraction, which opened at Epcot Center in 1989. Curtis also appeared alongside Fred Savage in some deleted scenes in the 1989 movie The Wizard as "Mitchell". Curtis has not acted since 1990, the same year he made guest appearances on episodes of Full House titled, "Thirteen Candles" and "Just Say No Way". Curtis credits his professional upbringing with his enthusiasm to produce music to the result of very high expectations.

Curtis has been married since 2005. A keen musician, Curtis is in the bands The Up and Ornj", having also played with The Greedy Kings and Champion. He has produced Lane Change and was a member of the shadow punk band, The Fuglies. In December 2005, Curtis prepared with his band RED for a gig at Paramount Studios for New Year's Eve. Gridlock 2006 with the Pussycat Dolls performing at midnight and hosted by Pamela Anderson. Curtis now produces music in Reno as co-owner of The 505 Recording Group. With bands like Sinister Scene, The Kanes, Sil Shoda, Full Count, Demension 13 and Broken Roots under his belt, he is bringing recording to the musician with professionalism and at rates that are attainable on any budget. Curtis believes that bands should be able to create, and not have to invest a ridiculous amount of money to do so.

External links
 

American male television actors
American male soap opera actors
Living people
1976 births
People from Van Nuys, Los Angeles
American male child actors
American male film actors
20th-century American male actors